Lee Bo-ram (born February 17, 1987) is a South Korean singer and actress. She is a former member of girl group SeeYa. She joined the project group 2Boram in 2011. In July 2022, she debuted as a member of WSG Wannabe after joining MBC's Hangout with Yoo, as well as joining the sub-unit for the group Gaya-G.

Discography

Extended plays

Singles

Soundtrack appearances

Filmography

Television series

Television shows

Musical

Awards and nominations

Notes

References

External links

1987 births
Living people
MBK Entertainment artists
South Korean women pop singers
K-pop singers
South Korean television actresses
South Korean female idols
21st-century South Korean women singers
21st-century South Korean actresses